The 2020–21–22 Asian Tour was the 26th season of the modern Asian Tour, the main men's professional golf tour in Asia excluding Japan, since it was established in 1995.

Schedule
The following table lists official events during the 2020–21–22 season.

Order of Merit
The Order of Merit was based on prize money won during the season, calculated in U.S. dollars.

Notes

References

External links
The Asian Tour's official site

Asian Tour
Asian Tour
Asian Tour
Asian Tour
Tour
Tour
Tour